Shannon is a small farming community in the Parish of Wickham in Queens County, New Brunswick, Canada. The name traces its origin to one of the first settlers, John Shanahan. It adjoins the similar communities of Henderson Settlement, Belyeas Cove and Bald Hill.

History

Notable people

See also
List of communities in New Brunswick

References

Communities in Queens County, New Brunswick